Sir George Crewe, 8th Baronet (1 February 1795 – 1 January 1844) was an English Tory politician who represented the constituency of South Derbyshire.

Biography

Crewe was the eldest surviving son of Sir Henry Harpur Crewe, 7th Baronet and his wife Ann Hawkins, daughter of Isaac Hawkins. His father took the name and arms of Crewe by royal sign manual in 1808.  Crewe was educated at Rugby School. On 7 February 1818, at the age of 24, he succeeded his father, who died after falling from his coach box. He inherited the Baronetcy, Calke Abbey the family seat and extensive properties in Derbyshire, Staffordshire, and Leicestershire.

Crewe was called upon to serve as High Sheriff of Derbyshire in 1821, and one of his first acts was to do away with the Assize Ball publishing a letter "showing how cruel and heartless it appeared that any person should be found engaged in worldly mirth and amusement on so solemn an occasion, when so many poor creatures were trembling on the eve of their trial, perhaps for their lives." After several years looking after his estates, he was persuaded to stand as Member of Parliament for South Derbyshire in 1835, and was returned again in 1837. His health was always poor and he retired in 1841.  Crewe was a considerable philanthropist with strong Christian principles, and was considered "too conscientious for a member of Parliament". Shocked by the poor conditions in which his tenants lived and worked he built schools and rebuilt the churches at Ticknall and Calke, staffing them with well educated clergy. The Harpur Crewe family were great collectors, and Sir George collected paintings, stuffed birds and animals. Harper Crewe became the President of the Derby Town and County Museum and Natural History Society in 1836. This organisation became Derby Museum and Art Gallery.

He died at his home at Calke Abbey aged 48.

Crewe married in 1819 Jane Whitaker, daughter of the Rev. Thomas Whitaker, Vicar of Mendham, Norfolk. They had six children and he was succeeded by his son Sir John Harpur Crewe, 9th Baronet.

References

 Debrett's Baronetage of England  7th Edition (1839) pp 34/5 (Google Books)

External links 

1795 births
1844 deaths
People from South Derbyshire District
People educated at Rugby School
Baronets in the Baronetage of England
Crewe, George Harpur, 8th Baronet
UK MPs 1835–1837
UK MPs 1837–1841
Conservative Party (UK) MPs for English constituencies
People associated with Derby Museum and Art Gallery
High Sheriffs of Derbyshire